Holroyd is a small suburb in western Sydney, New South Wales, Australia. The previous local government area of Holroyd City took its name from Arthur Holroyd, first Mayor of the area, local landowner and businessman. The administrative centre is located in nearby Merrylands.

Holroyd shares the postcode of 2142 with the separate nearby suburbs of Granville, South Granville, Camellia and Rosehill.

History
Arthur Todd Holroyd (1806-1887) acquired Sherwood Scrubs in 1855. Located in Merrylands, it was named after his former home in England. Holroyd became a Member of Parliament for Bathurst Plains then Parramatta, and was a judge for the NSW Supreme Court, had completed one year medical residency in London and was a keen businessman. He was respected and powerful and was on many and varied boards and committees. He became the first mayor of Holroyd Council, then the Municipality of Prospect & Sherwood, from 1872 to 1927 with only 250 ratepayers for first 9 years. He made clay pipes for drainage at Sherwood Scrubs and introduced drainage to the local area. He also encouraged the rail line to Parramatta Junction. 

The suburb of Holroyd was created when the New South Wales Geographical Names Board sought to define suburb boundaries in 1999. Holroyd Council Local Government Area did not have a specific suburb of the same name and had to create one to satisfy the State Government requirements as carried out by the Geographical Names Board. The suburb named Holroyd was gazetted in 1999 with boundaries being Walpole Street (north),  Neil Street (south) the railway line (east) and Pitt Street (west). There was a change to the boundary in 2001 with the northern boundary extended to the freeway.

Landmarks
The historic Goodlet and Smith Brickpit sites have now been redeveloped into Holroyd Gardens Park on the site of a clay pit that was later filled. Holroyd Gardens Estate which is a medium density development that includes the remaining heritage brickwork kilns and associated buildings.

Population
At the 2016 census, there were 1,275 residents in Holroyd. 35.7% of people were born in Australia. The next most common country of birth was India at 9.0%.  27.3% of people spoke only English at home. Other languages spoken at home included Arabic at 8.3%. The most common responses for religion were Islam 27.2%, Catholic 18.4%, No Religion 18.0% and Hinduism 10.2%.

References

Suburbs of Sydney
Cumberland Council, New South Wales